Alfred Fleishman (June 16, 1905 – May 28, 2002) was an American businessman and the co-founder of Fleishman-Hillard with his business partner Robert Hillard. Over the course of his career, Fleishman earned a reputation not only as one of the pioneers of public relations, but also as an author, educator, humanitarian, and champion of the state of Israel.

Early life
Fleishman was born in St. Louis, Missouri on June 16, 1905. He went on to study at the St. Louis College of Pharmacy before being inducted into the U.S. Army; as a major in the Army Air Corps, he spent World War II primarily as a Pentagon-based public information officer.

Jewish community work
Sent by the American Jewish Congress as a special consultant to the Secretary of Defense, he traveled to war-torn Germany in October 1945 to head a survey committee that studied the psychological, economic, and social needs of displaced people in Germany and Austria. Fleishman was an early eyewitness to the horrors of the Holocaust, and his research and subsequent report alerted many organizations in the United States to the Jews displaced by World War II. Upon completion of his report, he made a 60-city U.S. lecture tour, discussing the refugees’ relief and rehabilitation needs. The trip would result in him becoming involved in various Jewish causes and with minority affairs as a whole. A longtime member of the Jewish Agency for Israel, Fleishman made 57 visits to Israel between 1955 and 1997, becoming a personal friend of many of the founders and leaders of the state.

After completing his military duty, Fleishman was awarded the Legion of Merit for his services in the rehabilitation of World War II combat casualties and amputees, with accomplishments including putting together a widely distributed publication called “Coming Home.”  He also received the Americanism Medal from the Veterans of Foreign Wars.

Fleishman was a former president of Congregation B'nai Amoona in Creve Coeur, a former president and campaign chairman of the Jewish Federation of St. Louis, and a co-founder of the St. Louis Jewish Light newspaper.

Partnership with Hillard
Upon his return from Europe in 1946, Fleishman formed a business partnership with Robert Hillard. The two had known each other for more than a decade, dating back to when Fleishman had served as chief deputy to the city’s circuit clerk, and Hillard was a reporter for the St. Louis Star-Times. Their firm began in a rented room above a Woolworth’s store and has since grown to become one of the world’s largest public relations agencies.

Fleishman served as the firm’s chairman until his retirement in 1975 at the age of 70. In 1996, he and co-founder Hillard received a Lifetime Achievement Award from Inside PR (now known as The Holmes Report).

General semantics
In addition to his prominence in the public relations arena, Fleishman gained distinction in the field of general semantics, writing three books on the subject – Sense and Nonsense: A Study in Human Communication, Troubled Talk, and Dialogue With Street Fighters. Each was recognized as Book of the Year by the International Society of General Semantics. He was also the author of numerous articles on public relations and human communication and lectured extensively on those topics throughout the country.

Awards and honors
Fleishman received numerous awards and recognition over the course of his career. These included the Distinguished Service Medal for Civic Achievement by the United States Junior Chamber of Commerce, the Community Service Award and the Humanitarian Award from the St. Louis Human Development Corporation, and the Community Service Award from the American Jewish Committee.

References

External links 
 Alfred Fleishman Papers Digital Collection at St. Louis Public Library
Alfred Fleishman Papers at St. Louis Public Library

1905 births
2002 deaths
Businesspeople from St. Louis
American Jewish Congress
American public relations people
Recipients of the Legion of Merit
20th-century American businesspeople